The Gray Havens are an American Christian folk pop husband and wife duo, David and Licia Radford, from Crystal Lake, Illinois. They started their music recording careers in 2012. Their first release, an extended play, Where Eyes Don't Go, was released by Zodlounge Music, in 2013. Their first full album, Fire and Stone, was released in 2015 with funds raised on Kickstarter

Background 

The duo are a husband and wife group, who married on August 25, 2012. They met while on a mission trip to British Columbia.  David and Licia Radford (née, Keyes) are from Crystal Lake, Illinois, David is a former American Idol contestant, vocalist, guitarist, and pianist, and, Licia is a vocalist, mandolinist, and an ukulelist. They are members of the Evangelical Free Church of Crystal Lake. They moved to Nashville, Tennessee in 2014.

Music history 

The husband and wife duo commenced their recording careers in 2012, with the extended play, Where Eyes Don't Go, and it was released on January 25, 2013 by Zodlounge Music. Their first studio album, Fire and Stone, was released on January 6, 2015, independently. It was ranked in the Top 10 Albums of 2015 on Jesusfreakhideout.com. Their second studio album, Ghost of a King, was released on April 8, 2016, by Artist Garden Entertainment.

Members 

 Dave Radford (born March 22, 1988) – vocals, guitar, piano
 Licia Radford (née, Keyes) (born September 21, 1990) – vocals, percussion, mandolin, ukulele

Discography 

Studio albums
 Fire and Stone (January 6, 2015)
 Ghost of a King (April 8, 2016, Artist Garden)
 She Waits (October 5, 2018, Artist Garden)
 Blue Flower (October 8, 2021, Blue Flower Records)
EPs
 Where Eyes Don't Go (January 25, 2013)
 Rest EP (September 25, 2020)

References

External links
 
 Cross Rhythms artist profile
 Tour Dates

American musical duos
Musical groups established in 2012
Musical groups from Illinois
2012 establishments in Illinois